Arkivet (meaning the Archive)  is the established name of Vesterveien 4 in Kristiansand, Norway. The building was constructed in 1935 for the Archival Services in Kristiansand, and in the periods 1935–1940 and 1945–1997 used by this institution. Nevertheless, the building is known as the headquarters of the Gestapo in southern Norway in the period 1942–1945. The building is owned and operated by the foundation Stiftelsen Arkivet.  Arikivet is located in the residential area of Bellevue overlooking the western harbor of Kristiansand. The building in the functionalist style was completed in 1935, and was 8 March of that year officially adopted by the local department of the National Archives.

Gestapo headquarters 
 See also the incomplete List of Arkivet prisoners
After Norway was occupied by Nazi Germany in April 1940, the building was taken over by German anti-aircraft troops. In 1941 it was given back to the Norwegian National Archives. A year later, in 1942, the building was requisitioned by the Gestapo, however. Until May 1945 Vesterveien 4 was the Gestapo headquarters in the southern Norway.
 
The SS-Hauptsturmführer and Kriminalkommisar Rudolf Kerner was in charge of the building at Vesterveien 4, from then on known as Arkivet, one of the most notorious Gestapo stations in Norway, feared by the Norwegian resistance fighters. According to figures from Stiftelsen Arkivet were
 about 3,500 Norwegians arrested by the Gestapo and detained for several days in Arkivet.
 367 Norwegian men and women roughly tortured here. Several died during or as a result of torture.

From the "House of horror" as Arkivet was nicknamed, Kerner himself and five other Gestapo officers in addition to Norwegian collaborationists including Ole Wehus were prosecuted and harshly judged during the Legal purge in Norway after World War II. 
 
In 1945 the building was again adopted by the Norwegian National Archives. All archival material during the war were brought to safety in Oslo – which was also kept in the silver mines at Kongsberg – and no material was lost while the German occupiers were in possession of the building. The building was once again used by the National Archives until 1997.

Stiftelsen Arkivet 
After the National Archives in Kristiansand was moved to a new building in another location, the old building was taken over by the foundation Stiftelsen Arkivet, which conducts education and documentation, research on and outreach on Norwegian occupation history.

The basement, where there is a museum furnished, is brought back to the condition it was in the period 1942–1945, with reconstructions of cells, torture chambers and equipment. Among others is the torture scene where Henriette Bie Lorentzen was tortured reconstructed.  Arkivet is the only existing, authentic Gestapo headquarters in Norway.

The building became an information center about Norway during World War II and education for peace building and conflict resolution.

The first floor and upwards of the building is leased to humanitarian organizations as the Red Cross and Amnesty International.
 
The names of 162 Norwegian victims who were killed in concentration camps or executed, are mounted on a monument in front of the building.

The building is open to the public.

Wartime sailing research

The foundation received through the Norwegian government budget for 2016, funds to establish a Norwegian documentation center for wartime sailing history and the operation of a new War Sailor Register. This is a search website for ships, crews and individuals who sailed for Norwegian ships and Norwegians on foreign ships during World War II.  This is a topic that Stftelsen Arkivet has researched around for some time already.

References

Literature in Norwegian 
 Taraldsen, Kristen: Arkivet - torturens høyborg. Stiftelsen Arkivet, Kristiansand (2003)

External links 
 Stiftelsen Arkivet homepage 
 The Gestapo at Arkivet 
 After the peace 
 The Gestapo Exhibition
 Arne Laudal's story 
 Louis Hogganvik's story 
 Norske kollaboratører på Arkivet (Norwegian collaborators at Arkivet) 

 
Buildings and structures in Kristiansand
Modernist architecture in Norway
Norway in World War II
Gestapo
1935 establishments in Norway
Museums in Kristiansand
Nazi concentration camps in Norway